Kuzah Topraqi (also Romanized as Kūzah Toprāqī; also known as Kūzah Torpāqī) is a village in Fuladlui Shomali Rural District, Hir District, Ardabil County, Ardabil Province, Iran. At the 2006 census, its population was 153, in 36 families.

References 

Towns and villages in Ardabil County